The United States Senate election of 1964 in Connecticut was held on November 3, 1964. Democratic Thomas J. Dodd was re-elected and served a second term. John Davis Lodge, grandson of Henry Cabot Lodge was defeated by almost 30%.

Results

References

Connecticut
1964
1964 Connecticut elections